Coney Island, alternatively known as Pulau Serangoon, is a 133-hectare island located off the northeastern coast of Singapore within the town of Punggol, between Pulau Ubin to its northeast and the mainland to its southwest.

Land reclamation works were carried out on the island from 1975 to the 1990s, as there were plans to build residential buildings on the southern part of the island. The works narrowed the channel between Punggol and the island to 100m. Still, in spite of this small distance, motor launches had to be specially hired to reach the island until the opening of Coney Island Park, linked to the main island by two bridges on its western and eastern ends.

History

Formerly known as Pulau Serangoon (English: Serangoon Island), the island was once owned by entrepreneur siblings Aw Boon Haw and Aw Boon Par, before being sold to an Indian businessman, Ghulam Mahmood, in 1950 with the intention of turning the island into a resort modelled after the amusement area at Coney Island, New York.

Further land reclamation works were carried out during the 1990s with plans to build a 50-hectare park together with the development of Punggol New Town.

The Urban Redevelopment Authority (URA) said that under the Master Plan, a part of Coney Island was zoned for residential, sport and recreational use but as the land is not immediately required for development, a part of Coney Island would be kept as an interim park for the time being. The rest of the island was zoned for park use. The offshore island of Pulau Serangoon (Coney Island), was formerly part of the Changi SMC from 1951 to 1997, then subsumed into East Coast GRC (Siglap division) from 1997 to 2015 before transferring to Pasir Ris-Punggol GRC after the growth of Punggol.

Activities and facilities
Coney Island is also a popular place for jet skiing and camping. However, this has contributed to the beaches being polluted by litter such as discarded cans, instant noodle packets and bottles.

Coney Island Park
Managed by the National Parks Board, the  nature park is home to a wide variety of habitats, including coastal forests, grasslands and mangroves. The park was officially opened by the Transport Minister and Co-ordinating Minister for Infrastructure, Khaw Boon Wan on 10 October 2015. During its first year of operation, a free-ranging Brahman cow was frequently sighted in the area.

Scouting

The island was proposed as the main venue to host the 23rd World Scout Jamboree, as part of a defeated bid by the Singapore Scout Association.

References

Notes
 Victor R Savage, Brenda S A Yeoh (2004), Toponymics - A Study of Singapore Street Names, Eastern Universities Press, 

Serangoon
North-Eastern Islands
Tourist attractions in North-East Region, Singapore